Strand Life Sciences, formerly Strand Genomics, is an Indian in silico technology company, based in Bangalore. Strand focuses in data mining, predictive modeling, computational chemistry, software engineering, bioinformatics, and research biology to develop software and services for life sciences research. Strand also offers custom solutions based on its intellectual property. In 2021, Reliance Industries' subsidiary Reliance Strategic Business Ventures acquired a controlling stake in Strand Life Sciences.

History
Strand Life Sciences was founded in October 2000 by Professors Vijay Chandru, Ramesh Hariharan, Swami Manohar, and V. Vinay. It was registered as Strand Genomics, but was later renamed to Strand Life Sciences as it dealt with various other aspects of life sciences. In August 2007, Strand and Agilent Technologies, Inc. entered an agreement in which Strand develops and supports Agilent's GeneSpring software which Agilent obtained through Silicon Genetics acquisition in August 2004. In October 2010, Strand and Agilent renewed the agreement for Strand to expand the scope of Agilent's GeneSpring across multiple life sciences disciplines.

Software

 Strand NGS (formerly Avadis NGS) is a software platform for next-generation sequencing data analysis.
 GeneSpring GX (version 9.0.0 onwards), GeneSpring Workgroup (version 7.0.0 onwards), and Mass Profiler Pro are developed by Strand's R&D division in Bangalore.
 Avadis is a data mining and visualization platform.
 Sarchitect is a platform for modeling and predicting drug-relevant properties of molecules in silico.
 ArrayAssist was developed for Stratagene, Inc., based on the Avadis platform. The production was stopped after Stratagene was acquired by Agilent Technologies, Inc. in 2007.

References

External links
Strand Life Sciences

Biotechnology companies of India
Software companies of India
Biotechnology companies established in 2000
Information technology companies of Bangalore
Privately held companies of India
2000 establishments in Karnataka
Reliance Industries